USS Hampton has been the name of more than one United States Navy ship, and may refer to:

, also listed as USS Hampton (SP-3049), a tug in commission from 1918 to 1919
, an attack transport in commission from 1945 to 1946
USS PCS-1386, a patrol craft sweeper commissioned in 1944, renamed  in February 1956, decommissioned in April 1956, and used as a non-commissioned training ship until sold in 1959
, a submarine commissioned in 1993 and currently in active service

See also
, a patrol vessel, minesweeper, and lightvessel in commission from 1917 to 1919

United States Navy ship names